Movidius is a company based in San Mateo, California, that designs specialised low-power processor chips for computer vision. The company was acquired by Intel in September 2016.

Company history
Movidius was co-founded in Dublin in 2005, by Sean Mitchell and David Moloney. Between 2006 and 2016, it raised nearly $90 million in capital funding. In May 2013, the company appointed Remi El-Ouazzane as CEO. In January 2016, the company announced a partnership with Google. Movidius has been active in Google's Project Tango project, and Movidius also announced a planned acquisition by Intel in September 2016.

Products

Myriad 2
The company's Myriad 2 chip is an always-on manycore vision processing unit that can function on power-constrained devices. The Fathom is a USB stick containing a Myriad 2 processor, allowing a vision accelerator to be added to devices using ARM processors including PCs, drones, robots, IoT devices and video surveillance for tasks such as identifying people or objects. It can run at between 80 and 150 GFLOPS on little more than 1W of power.

Myriad X
Intel's Myriad X VPU (vision processing unit) is the third generation and most advanced VPU from Movidius, an Intel company. Intel's Myriad X VPU is the first of its class to feature the Neural Compute Engine—a dedicated hardware accelerator for the deep neural network deep-learning inferences. The Neural Compute Engine in conjunction with the 16 SHAVE cores and an ultra-high throughput intelligent memory fabric makes Myriad X an option for on-device deep neural networks and computer vision applications. Intel's Myriad X VPU has received additional upgrades to imaging and vision engines including additional programmable SHAVE cores, upgraded and expanded vision accelerators, and a new native 4K image processor pipeline with support for up to 8 HD sensors connecting directly to the VPU. As with Myriad 2, the Myriad X VPU is programmable via the Myriad Development Kit (MDK) which includes all necessary development tools, frameworks, and APIs to implement a custom vision, imaging and deep neural network workloads on the chip.

Neural Compute Stick

The Intel Movidius Neural Compute Stick (NCS) is a tiny fanless deep-learning device that can be used to learn AI programming at the edge. NCS is powered by the same low-power, high-performance Intel Movidius Vision Processing Unit that can be found in millions of smart security cameras, gesture-controlled drones, industrial machine vision equipment, and more. Supported frameworks are TensorFlow and Caffe. 

On 14 November 2018, the company announced the latest version of NCS, marketed as "Neural Compute Stick 2" at the AI DevCon event in Beijing.

Uses
 Google Clips camera uses Myriad 2 VPU. 
 The Intel RealSense Tracking Camera T265 is another product that uses the Myriad 2.
 Mavic used the Myriad 2 in all consumer drones announced in 2016.
 The Ryze Tello affordable programmable drone, licensing Mavic Software, uses the Myriad 2 VPU.
 ComBox Technology uses Myriad X in ComBox x64 PCIe Blad board for CNN inference in DC.

See also
 Vision processing unit
 MPSoC
 Coprocessor
 Convolutional neural network

References

OpenCL compute devices
 Technology companies based in the San Francisco Bay Area
 Companies based in San Mateo, California
 Technology companies established in 2005
 Intel acquisitions
2016 mergers and acquisitions